Alliance of Volunteer Educators is a NGO and party-list in the Philippines.

In the 2004 elections for the House of Representatives the party-list got 343,498 votes (2.7% of the nationwide party-list vote) and one seat (Eulogio Magsaysay).

Electoral performance

References

Party-lists represented in the House of Representatives of the Philippines